Wells Regional Transportation Center is an Amtrak train station in Wells, Maine. The station sits next to the Pan Am Railways mainline, formerly the Western Route mainline of the Boston and Maine Railroad.

History
In 1993, the town of Wells voted to build a transportation center for intercity buses and then-planned Amtrak service.  service began on December 15, 2001, with only a platform at Wells. The station building was constructed in 2002 and opened in 2003.

The Northern New England Passenger Rail Authority (NNERPA) is adding a  second track through Wells to allow an additional daily Brunswick-Wells round trip. The project will also add a second platform and a footbridge to the Wells station. The plan was issued in 2019; In February 2020, NNERPA was awarded a $16.9 million federal grant for the project.

References

External links

Wells Amtrak Station – USA Rail Guide (TrainWeb)

Wells, Maine
Amtrak stations in Maine
Railway stations in the United States opened in 2001
Transit centers in the United States
Bus stations in Maine
Stations along Boston and Maine Railroad lines
Transportation buildings and structures in York County, Maine